Diwan or Divan is a term of Arabic origin referring to various types of reception halls. The term occurs in various examples of Islamic architecture, where it can also refer to a government council chamber (related to the divan), as well as in a more specific sense in Mughal architecture. They tend to occur in pairs in the Mughal imperial capitals; the most famous ones are in Agra Fort, but there are others in Red Fort, Delhi and Fatehpur Sikri and certain other princely capitals such as Amber and also in Lahore Fort Pakistan.

Dīwān-e-Ām
The Dīwān-e-Ām (Persian ديوان عام), also Divan-i-Aam, was the court's Hall of Public Audience, where the ruler held mass audience. He would sit on his throne facing petitioners. His minister would assemble the petitions and refer them to the Dīwān-e-Khās for private audience. It was made by Shah Jahan.

Dīwān-e-Khās

The Dīwān-e-Khās (Persian: ديوان خاص) was the court's Hall of Private Audience, smaller than the Dīwān-e-Ām. Here envoys and other honoured guests were granted a personal audience with the ruler. At Agra, the Dīwān-i-Khās is a small marble structure near the Dīwān-e-Ām. It is inside a red fort. It was the most ornamental building built by Shahjhan. It was decorated by gems and gold silver linings. A channel built by marble in which water flows justifies its exceptional beauty. On one of its walls this verse in Persian language is written:

References 

Islamic architecture
Mughal architecture elements
Ottoman architecture